Allstate NI is a company based in Belfast, Derry and Strabane in Northern Ireland.

Allstate NI specialises in delivering technology and business services to its parent company, Allstate. The company currently employs around 2,300 workers.

History 
The company established its first office in Corporation Street, Belfast. The company then moved its headquarters to a larger building in Lanyon Place. In 2018 they moved into a new building in Mays Meadow. They also opened another two offices in Derry Strabane. .

The company was previously known as "Northbrook Technology". As of May 7, 2008, Northbrook Technology was rebranded to Allstate Northern Ireland.

Allstate NI is Northern Ireland's largest and most successful IT company, winning business awards at local and national level, including two Queen's Award for Enterprise. for 'Best Enterprise and International Trade' in 2005 for 'Enterprise - Sustainable Development' in 2014.

In 2015, Allstate Northern Ireland opened an Extreme Agile software development lab and learning space (CompoZed Labs) in its Belfast headquarters.

References

External links

Allstate
Technology companies established in 1999
Companies of Northern Ireland
Companies based in Belfast
1999 establishments in Northern Ireland
Northern Irish subsidiaries of foreign companies